= Radar range =

Radar range may refer to

- Microwave ovens, used to be called "radaranges" when first marketed
- Radar range equation, an equation relating the power received by a radar to the distance separating the radar from the target
